Intruder is a 2021 television police procedural thriller four-part miniseries starring Sally Lindsay, Elaine Cassidy, Tom Meeten and Helen Behan. It was broadcast on Channel 5 on four consecutive nights from 5 April to 8 April 2021. The series revolves around a married couple (Cassidy and Meeten) living a perfect wealthy life in Cornwall, but after their house is burgled, they inadvertently kill one of the intruders. Sally Lindsay plays the police officer assigned to the case.

References

External links
 

2021 British television series debuts
2021 British television series endings
2020s British drama television series
2020s British television miniseries
Channel 5 (British TV channel) original programming
English-language television shows